Gianfranco Baldanello (born 13 November 1928) is an Italian film director, screenwriter and second unit director. He sometimes used the alias Frank G. Carroll.

Baldanello is the son of actors Emilio Baldanello and Vanda Vianello (also known as Vanda Baldanello).  In 1965 Baldanello directed his first film, 30 Winchester per El Diablo (also known as Gold Train), a western for which he also wrote the screenplay. He followed this in 1966 with a second Western, Kill Johnny Ringo.

In 1967 he directed three movies, the comedy I Do Not Ever Say Goodbye, the spy film Danger!! Death Ray, and another Western, Long Days of Hate.

External links and sources 
 
Biography at Mymovies.it

1928 births
Living people
Italian film directors
Italian screenwriters
Italian male screenwriters